Gaspar de la Huerta (1645–1714) was a Spanish artist  born at Campillo de Altobuey in Cuenca.

At an early age, seeking instruction in Valencia, he fell into the hands of Jesualda Sanchez, the bustling widow of Pedro Infant, a third-rate painter, who continued on her own account her husband's school for the manufacture of religious pictures. La Huerta, nevertheless, attained some skill as a draughtsman and colourist, and married the widow's well-dowered daughter. Working for moderate prices he found abundant employment in the neighbouring churches and convents.

For the Franciscans he painted the Jubilee of the Porciuncula, and for the Dominicans the picture which long served as a veil to the wondrous image of Our Lady of the Forsaken. He died at Valencia in 1714. The Museum of Valencia possesses a pleasing picture of Christ and the Virgin enthroned, the latter with the bright complexion peculiar to Valencian beauty.

Notes

References
 García Mahíques, Rafael, El Salón del Cielo y de la Tierra del Palacio Ducal de Gandía, Entre cielos e infiernos: memoria del V Encuentro Internacional sobre Barroco, La Paz, Bolivia, 2010, p. 177-192.
 Montoya Beleña, Santiago, El pintor conquense Gaspar de la Huerta (Campillo de Altobuey, 1645-Valencia, 1714) (The Conkian Painter Gaspar de la Huerta (1645-1714)), Cuenca, no. 31-32 (1988), p. 31-52. 
Antonio Palomino, An account of the lives and works of the most eminent Spanish painters, sculptors and architects, 1724, first English translation, 1739, p. 173
Palomino, Antonio (1988). El museo pictórico y escala óptica III. El parnaso español pintoresco laureado. Madrid : Aguilar S.A.. , p. 565-66.
Pérez Sánchez, Alfonso E. (1992). Baroque Paintings in Spain, 1600-1750. Madrid : Cátedra. .
Attribution:

External links

 Portal at Gandía Ducal Palace 

1645 births
1715 deaths
17th-century Spanish painters
Spanish male painters
18th-century Spanish painters
18th-century Spanish male artists
People from the Province of Cuenca